Anything But Conservative ( or N'importe quoi d'autre que conservateur), also known as the ABC campaign and Vote ABC, is a political campaign which aims to defeat the Conservatives in Canadian federal elections. It encourages strategic voting.

Canadian federal elections use a first-past-the-post voting system, which allows a party with minority support among the population to win the majority of the seats in the Parliament. Given the make-up of existing political parties in the 21st century in Canada, the centre and centre-left vote tends to split between the federal NDP, Liberals and Greens, which allows for the Conservatives to win a disproportional number of seats in the parliament compared to their popular support. 

It is estimated by ABC campaigners that widespread strategic voting in 2015 federal elections decreased the number of Conservative seats by over 72.

Strategic voting
ABC voting means voting for the candidate among progressive parties (Greens, Liberals, and NDP) that is most likely to win the seat according to the public opinion polls.

Previous strategic voting campaigns
In the past, political parties have mounted similar campaigns to sway voters against a particular party.

Vote Anything but Liberal
During the 2001 Alberta provincial elections, Conservative Party leader Stephen Harper led the National Citizens Coalition in a Vote Anything but Liberal campaign.

2008 Federal Elections
The ABC campaign originated in the 2008 Canadian Federal Election by one of the provincial branches of the Conservative party encouraging voters in a specific province to support any party other than the federal Conservative Party. The campaign was established by Newfoundland and Labrador Premier Danny Williams and was targeted particularly within that province in response to what Williams called a broken promise by Conservative prime minister Stephen Harper regarding equalization payments to the province. The campaign was a success as all federal Conservative party candidates lost their seats in the province. Williams remained the Premier of Newfoundland and Labrador until his retirement from politics in 2010.

The project was officially overseen by an organization known simply as "ABC Campaign", which was affiliated with the provincial Progressive Conservative Party of which Williams is leader, and which was registered with Elections Canada as a "third party" for the purposes of election expenditures. The provincial government itself also paid for advertisements supporting the goals of the campaign. It has been estimated that the campaigners spent over $81,000 on the ABC campaign.

Background

The Progressive Conservative Premier of Newfoundland and Labrador Danny Williams attracted national attention on December 23, 2004, when he ordered all Canadian flags removed from provincial buildings during a dispute with then Prime Minister Paul Martin. Williams wanted the province to keep all of its offshore oil and gas revenues, along with equalization payments, an exception to the fiscal formula which rescinded equalization transfer payments to a province that had increased natural resources revenues. Martin largely accepted Williams' demands in late January 2005, supposedly due to an expected by-election (incumbent Liberal MP Lawrence D. O'Brien was terminally ill) that would hold the balance of power for the Liberal minority government. After O'Brien's death, Todd Russell retained the seat for the Liberals in the resulting by-election held on May 24, 2005, which helped to shore up the Martin government's tenuous position in parliament.

The agreement, known as the Atlantic Accord, was unpopular in the rest of Canada as it was considered unfair to other provinces. It was particularly criticized by Ontario Premier Dalton McGuinty. While Ontario was traditionally one of Confederation's "have" provinces, while Newfoundland was a "have-not", this has changed in recent years. McGuinty complained that his province – already sending more money to the federal government than it gets back in equalization payments – would get further shortchanged as the accord permitted Newfoundland to keep its oil revenues rather than sharing it with the other provinces. While the accord did prolong the federal Liberal government's time in power, it was viewed as "short-term gain for long-term pain" as Paul Martin gained a reputation for doing or saying whatever was possible in order to stay in power, something that caused Ontario voters to become disenchanted with the Liberals.

On January 4, 2006, during the 2006 Federal Election campaign, the then-opposition Conservative party leader Stephen Harper sent a letter to the conservative Premier of Newfoundland and Labrador Danny Williams with the following statement regarding the federal equalization formula:

Following the election and after 
becoming Prime Minister, Harper began to distance himself from the statement that October. The subsequent 2007 federal budget ostensibly met this promise by introducing the option of a new equalization formula allowing each province to exclude its natural resources – but it also imposed a cap on the amount of equalization each province could receive, effectively negating the Atlantic Accord. The budget also gave each province the option of retaining the original equalization formula, meaning that no province would lose revenue due to the new formula. This budget was praised by Ontario Premier McGuinty, a critic of the Atlantic Accord.

Nonetheless, Williams said that, based on the restrictions imposed on the new formula, the province had been "shafted", and that "based on the fact that they've broken their promise and broken their commitment, citizens should not vote Conservative in the next federal election."

The campaign
The federal Conservative Party does not have any formal affiliation to the various provincial Progressive Conservative parties (although there were ties with its predecessor, the federal Progressive Conservative). Nonetheless, the federal and Newfoundland Conservatives generally got along well until the equalization issue, so the ABC campaign represented an unusual public rift. It has to be noted that Newfoundland provincial parties generally had a history of conflict with their federal counterparts - notably Brian Peckford's dispute with Brian Mulroney over Hibernia oil, and Roger Grimes' criticism of Jean Chrétien over a moratorium in the cod fisheries.

The ABC campaign did not specifically endorse any alternative federal party, and Progressive Conservative politicians campaigned on behalf of candidates for both the federal Liberal and New Democratic parties. The campaign was successful in the sense that the federal Conservatives were shut out of Newfoundland and Labrador in the 2008 election; nationally, however, the campaign had little effect for that election, as that party was elected to another, stronger minority government. The long-term effect was seeing the federal conservative government reach an agreement to help fund hydroelectric power in Newfoundland which help ensure the re-election of the Conservative Party on May 2, 2011.

The campaign began unofficially in May 2007, when Williams told the Economic Club of Toronto that the decision would cost the province billions of dollars, adding: "I am encouraging Newfoundlanders and Labradorians, and Canadians, in the next federal election to simply vote ABC — easy to remember. Vote ABC — anything but Conservative." Harper and Newfoundland opposition leader Gerry Reid criticized Williams' "overreaction", saying "this kind of confrontation is damaging the business investment climate of Newfoundland and Labrador".
 Nonetheless in the provincial election held that year, Williams led the Conservatives to a resounding victory, capturing 44 of 48 seats in the legislature at the expense of the Liberals and NDP.

The "ABC" slogan became commonly used throughout the country during the campaign. A number of unaffiliated groups opposing the Conservatives' policies, including an environmental group calling itself "Project ABC", also used the slogan or similar sayings during the 2008 campaign. The anti-Conservative campaign also manifested itself in widespread promotion of strategic voting to minimize the number of seats won by the Conservatives. There were also online services organizing "vote swapping" to maximize the distribution of non-Conservative votes.

At the start of the 2008 election, a campaign website was launched, while members of the provincial PC caucus campaigned on behalf of federal Liberal and NDP candidates. All caucus members were expected to participate in the ABC campaign, with the exception of the backbencher (and one-time health minister) Elizabeth Marshall, who said she could not bring herself to support a Liberal or NDP candidate. No provincial PC politician openly supported the federal Conservatives during the 2008 campaign.

On a campaign visit to the province, Harper responded that "no one can tell a Newfoundlander and Labradorian how to vote," and that the voters' choice should be "about your own best interests."

Leo Power, a veteran of federal politics and the Conservative Party of Canada's campaign co-chair for Newfoundland and Labrador, said raising money and recruiting volunteers has proved difficult, and blames Williams's ABC campaign, saying it has cut deep into the federal election machine that was struggling to compete. Power has also said his party's best hope of winning a seat in the province was in the riding of Avalon with incumbent candidate Fabian Manning.

While there was "anyone but Harper" activity stemming from a variety of sources across the country, the ABC campaign's national presence was limited to media interviews and a billboard on the Gardiner Expressway in Toronto; Williams did not travel across Canada as he had previously suggested. The Newfoundland and Labrador portion of the campaign was successful; of the province's seven seats in the House of Commons, the Liberals won six while the NDP won one, with the Conservatives being shut out. Nationally, the campaign had little noticeable effect; the federal Conservatives were elected to a second consecutive minority government, with more seats than in the previous parliament, including gains in Ontario (whose politicians had been most critical of the Atlantic Accord). However, the shut out of Conservative MPs in Newfoundland and Labrador likely contributed to the lack of a majority government for the conservatives.

Legacy
As a result of the ABC Campaign all federal Conservative candidates lost their seats in Newfoundland and Labrador and remain unpopular in the province. In the 2011 federal election, the Conservatives gained a single seat in Newfoundland and Labrador, likely as a result of the later changes to the equalization.

The provincial Progressive Conservatives led by Williams won 44 out of 48 seats in the provincial elections. 
Williams remained the Premier of Newfoundland and Labrador until his retirement in 2010. He retired from politics on December 3, 2010.

Post-campaign Williams argued that the federal Conservative government's changes to equalization payments would cost Newfoundland $1.6 billion over three years, as it removes the ability of the province to choose whether to sign on to previously announced equalization policies. However, the budget passed in February 2009, with the support of the official opposition Liberals led by Michael Ignatieff. Williams unsuccessfully lobbied the Liberals to remove the changes to equalization, but Ignatieff refused, saying "I'm not in the business of carrying Premier Williams' water. He has to understand that I have to represent Canadians from coast to coast to coast and from all provinces". St. John's mayor Dennis O'Keefe suggested that the Liberal MPs from Newfoundland would be committing "political suicide" if they followed the party line on the budget.
 Ignatieff permitted the six Newfoundland Liberal MPs to break with party discipline and vote against the budget. Ignatieff resigned after losing the 2011 federal elections.

Williams' position was supported by one other provincial premier, Prince Edward Island's Robert Ghiz. Williams was disappointed by the lack of support from other provinces, saying "This is a great country and I want to be part of it, but the country disappoints me when we don't rally to protect each other."

2015 Federal elections

Campaign 
There has been a grass-root campaign for strategic voting in the 2015 federal elections to prevent another Conservative government after a decade in power. Several websites were set up to help voters in voting strategically and deciding if a particular candidate has any chance of winning the seat in their riding.

Thousands of grass-root volunteers knocked on doors to ask Canadians to vote strategically in key ridings.

The leadership of Unifor, Canada's second largest union, has called on its members to vote strategically. The leadership of CUPE, Canada's largest union, supports NDP and is opposed to strategic voting.

Legacy 
The campaign was a success. Many NDP voters strategically voted for the Liberals which led to the Liberals winning a strong majority of 184 and the Conservatives losing 60 seats. According to Éric Grenier "With the Conservatives performing only slightly below expectations in the seat count, these surprise wins came largely at the expense of the NDP in some of their most secure ridings, as the Liberals' momentum swept up strategic voters to carry them over the majority threshold." Post election polls show that roughly one third of the votes for the Liberal party candidates were cast strategically to prevent another Conservative government. Strategic voting negatively affected NDP in Quebec and Ontario but helped them win seats in British Columbia and Alberta. 44 per cent of NDP voters in British Columbia and 40 per cent in Alberta said that they were voting strategically for NDP.

References

2008 Canadian federal election
2015 Canadian federal election
Canadian political websites